Lankalakoderu Halt railway station (station code: LKDU) is situated on Narasapuram –Bhimavaram branch railway between Veeravasaram and Chinthaparru stations. It is close to National Highway 216 and is a walkable distance from Areas Bhageswaram-Poolapalli located on NH 216. This railway station is administered under Vijayawada railway division of South Coast Railway Zone.

References

Railway stations on Bhimavaram-Narasapur branch line
Railway stations in West Godavari district
Vijayawada railway division